Wilgartswiesen is a municipality in Südwestpfalz district, in Rhineland-Palatinate, western Germany.

Geography 
The municipality lies in the southern part of the Palatine Forest, the German part of the Wasgau, in the middle of the Palatine Forest-North Vosges Biosphere Reserve. On the territory of Wilgartswieser the Wellbach stream empties into the Queich, which itself is one of the main drainage systems of the Palatinate region. North of the village run several bunter sandstone rock groups, out of which the castles of  Wilgartaburg and Falkenburg have been hewn. The municipal terrain, most of which is part of the Frankenweide, is almost entirely wooded.

References

Municipalities in Rhineland-Palatinate
Palatinate Forest
South Palatinate
Südwestpfalz